The White Lotus Foundation trains and certifies instructors of Yoga. It was founded in 1968 and is led by Ganga White, A practitioner of Hatha-Vinyasa Yoga.

Organization
The Board of Trustees and Advisory Board feature many individuals prominent in their fields, including professor David G. White, Ph.D., doctor Hyla Cass, MD, and the musician/songwriter Sting.  Sting wrote a foreword to White's book, titled Yoga Beyond Belief, in 2007.

The Foundation holds four two-week teacher training sessions each year with up to thirty attendees each, as well as retreats for yoga therapy, Thai yoga therapy, meditation and advanced training lasting from three to seven days. White and wife Tracey Rich have produced numerous best-selling videos, including Total Yoga, one of the top selling Yoga videos in the United States  with total sales of more than 1.8 million copies.

Its mountain retreat headquarters and instruction center is located a few miles outside Santa Barbara, California within the Los Padres National Forest. The campus overlooks Santa Barbara, the Pacific Ocean and Channel Islands of California.  The foundation was housed in various locations in Los Angeles for about fifteen years, and then moved to its present site in 1983.

The Foundation has made its facilities available to public service groups, for example teens at risk programs in cooperation with The Art of Yoga Project and self-esteem programs through the Academy of Healing Arts. It has donated books to libraries and correctional facilities. It has offered teacher training scholarships for teachers committed to giving free service by way of yoga to women’s shelters and homes for abused women. White Lotus has been active in environmental rain forest preservation work.

Facilities include a large Yoga-meeting room, a kitchen and dining room serving vegetarian meals, an underground Hopi style Kiva temple and a Library-Media center designed and crafted by Santa Barbara artists. Accommodations include indoor housing, Yurts and campsites on plateaus overlooking the ocean.

Legislation
The United States House of Representatives voted on January 27, 2014 to pass the bill To provide for the conveyance of a small parcel of National Forest System land in Los Padres National Forest in California (H.R. 3008; 113th Congress). If the bill became law, it would authorize the exchange of 5 acres of land in the Los Padres National Forest for unspecified lands owned by the White Lotus Foundation. If the land exchange does not occur within two years, the Forest Service would offer to sell the land to the foundation, and the proceeds would be deposited in the Treasury. The House Natural Resources Committee report on the bill indicated that the White Lotus Foundation would have to close without the land due to a lack of accessibility.

References

Yoga organizations